Huayllán District is one of 4 districts in the Pomabamba Province of the Ancash Region in Peru.

Ethnic groups 
The people in the district are mainly indigenous citizens of Quechua descent. Quechua is the language which the majority of the population (89.73%) learnt to speak in childhood, 9.95% of the residents started speaking using the Spanish language (2007 Peru Census).

See also 
 Ancash Quechua
 Tuqtupampa
 Yaynu

References

External links
  Official website of the Pomabamba Province

Districts of the Pomabamba Province
Districts of the Ancash Region